The 1926 United States elections were held on November 2, 1926, in the middle of President Calvin Coolidge's second (only full) term. The Republican Party lost nine seats to the Democratic Party in the House of Representatives but retained a majority. The Republicans also lost six seats to the Democrats in the U.S. Senate but retained their majority. The Democratic gains in Congress were very modest for a midterm election, and since that time, the Republicans had not performed this well in midterm elections under a Republican president until 2002.

See also
1926 United States House of Representatives elections
1926 United States Senate elections
1926 United States gubernatorial elections

References

 
1926
United States midterm elections
November 1926 events